Ruslans Smolonskis (born 15 December 1996) is a Latvian racewalker. In 2019, he competed in the men's 50 kilometres walk at the 2019 World Athletics Championships held in Doha, Qatar. He was disqualified after a fourth red card.

In 2017, he finished in 16th place in the men's 20 kilometres walk at the 2017 European Athletics U23 Championships held in Bydgoszcz, Poland.

References

External links 
 

Living people
1996 births
Place of birth missing (living people)
Latvian male racewalkers
World Athletics Championships athletes for Latvia
Athletes (track and field) at the 2020 Summer Olympics
Olympic athletes of Latvia